Brian Mason is an American football coach and former player who is the special teams coordinator for  the Indianapolis Colts of the National Football League (NFL). He was previously the special teams coordinator at The University of Cincinnati. Prior to that, Mason was the Director of Recruiting at The University of Cincinnati for the 2017 season. Mason was a Graduate Assistant from 2009-2016 with stops at Bluffton (Graduate defensive line coach, 2009–11), Kent State (2012), Purdue (2013–14), and Ohio State (2015-2016). He played running back at Denison for two years before an injury forced him to transition from player to coach. He was a student assistant running back coach at Denison for the 2007 and 2008 seasons.

Coaching career

Early Coaching Career
From 2007 to 2008, Mason was Student Assistant Running Back coach at Denison University. Mason coached at Bluffton University from 2009 until 2011, serving as a graduate assistant defensive line coach. From Bluffton, Mason moved to Kent State University as a defensive graduate assistant on Darrell Hazell’s staff for the 2012 season, and followed Hazell to Purdue University for the 2013 and 2014 seasons.

Ohio State
Mason joined the staff at Ohio State University in 2015 and was a graduate assistant for two years.

Cincinnati
In January 2017, he was named the Director of Recruiting for the University of Cincinnati, and then in January 2018, he was promoted to Special Teams Coordinator. Mason helped lead the Bearcats to an appearance in the 2021 College Football Playoff.

Notre Dame
In January 2022, it was reported he would become the Special Teams Coordinator at the University of Notre Dame. The move re-united Mason with Marcus Freeman, whom he previously worked with at both Ohio State and Cincinnati.

Personal life
Mason is a native of Zionsville, Indiana and holds a bachelor's degree in Economics, and master's degrees in education (Bluffton, 2012), recreation and sports management (Purdue, 2014), and kinesiology, sport management (Ohio State, 2016).

External links
 Cincinnati profile

References

Year of birth missing (living people)
Living people
American football running backs
Denison Big Red football players
Denison Big Red football coaches
Bluffton Beavers football coaches
Kent State Golden Flashes football coaches
Purdue Boilermakers football coaches
Ohio State Buckeyes football coaches
Cincinnati Bearcats football coaches